Peter Benson (born 24 January 1967) is a former professional rugby league footballer who played in the 1980s and 1990s. He played at club level for the North Sydney Bears, Brisbane Broncos, Gold Coast (Twice), Wakefield Trinity (Heritage № 1034) and the Canberra Raiders.

Playing career

County Cup Final appearances
Peter Benson played left-, i.e. number 4, and scored three goals in Wakefield Trinity's 29-16 victory over Sheffield Eagles in the 1992–93 Yorkshire County Cup Final during the 1992–93 season at  Elland Road, Leeds on Sunday 18 October 1992.

References

Sources
 

1967 births
Living people
Australian rugby league players
Brisbane Broncos players
Canberra Raiders players
Gold Coast Chargers players
North Sydney Bears players
Place of birth missing (living people)
Rugby league centres
Rugby league fullbacks
Rugby league wingers
Wakefield Trinity players